Kevin Moyers is an American author, podcaster, and actor. He is the creator and writer of the Bunny 17 Media graphic novel "Scorn", comic book series "Blasto the Clown", essay books "Kevin Hates Everything" and "Second-Hand Boogers". He also co-writes the educational kids' book series "The Adventures of Casey and the Jackelope" with his daughter. He is also the costar of many independent films, including the Lionsgate film Machined and the international theatrical release Sportkill.

Books and Comic books 

Moyers has written or co-written over a dozen books, comic books, photo books, and more.

Podcasts 

Moyers has hosted and produced many podcasts for the Abnormal Entertainment network.

Filmography 

Source: Internet Movie Database

Stand-up comedy 
Moyers performed stand-up comedy in Arizona and around the country. His album Miserable Bastard was recorded and released in 2008.

References

Living people
American stand-up comedians
American male writers
21st-century American comedians